The 2016 Tour du Haut Var was a road cycling stage race that took place on 20 and 21 February 2016. The race was rated as a 2.1 event as part of the 2016 UCI Europe Tour, and was the 48th edition of the Tour du Haut Var.

The overall race victory was decided upon cumulative stage finishes, after ten riders finished both stages in the same time; with a stage win and a second-place finish, Arthur Vichot took honours in both the general classification and the points classification for the  team. Second place in the overall standings went to Jesús Herrada with finishes of fourth and second, while the podium was completed by 's Diego Ulissi, with finishes of fifth and sixth.

Teams
Nineteen teams were invited to start the race. These included eight UCI WorldTeams, six UCI Professional Continental teams and five UCI Continental teams.

Route

Stages

Stage 1
20 February 2016 — Le Cannet-des-Maures to Bagnols-en-Forêt,

Stage 2
21 February 2016 — Draguignan to Draguignan,

Classification leadership table
In the 2016 Tour du Haut Var, four different jerseys were awarded. For the general classification, calculated by adding each cyclist's finishing times on each stage, the leader received a yellow jersey. This classification was considered the most important of the 2016 Tour du Haut Var, and the winner of the classification was considered the winner of the race.

Additionally, there was a points classification, which awarded a green jersey. In the points classification, cyclists received points for finishing in the top 15 in a mass-start stage. For winning a stage, a rider earned 25 points, with 20 for second, 16 for third, 14 for fourth, 12 for fifth, 10 for sixth, then 1 point fewer per place down to 1 for 15th place. Points towards the classification could also be accrued at intermediate sprint points during each stage. There was also a mountains classification, the leadership of which was marked by a red jersey. In the mountains classification, points were won by reaching the top of a climb before other cyclists, with more points available for the higher-categorised climbs.

The fourth jersey represented the young rider classification, marked by a white jersey. This was decided in the same way as the general classification, but only riders born after 1 January 1991 were eligible to be ranked in the classification. There was also a classification for teams, in which the times of the best three cyclists per team on each stage were added together; the leading team at the end of the race was the team with the lowest total time.

References

2016 UCI Europe Tour
2016 in French sport
2016